Kenareh (also Romanized as Kenāreh; also known as Kināreh) is a village in Kenareh Rural District, in the Central District of Marvdasht County, Fars Province, Iran. At the 2006 census, its population was 6,853, in 1,742 families.

References 

Populated places in Marvdasht County